Lobor is a city and municipality in the Northern Croatia. In 2011 census, there were 3,188 inhabitants in the area, 98.96% of which were Croats. During the first year of the World War II Ustaše established a concentration camp in Lobor, also known as Loborgrad concentration camp, for Jewish and Serb women and children. At least 200 of them died in it.

References

Sources

External links
 

Populated places in Krapina-Zagorje County
Municipalities of Croatia